Together for Šumadija is a minor liberal-conservative political party in Serbia. Founded on May 2, 2009 by the Together for Kragujevac movement and by a series of citizen advocacy groups and political parties in Šumadija (Central Serbia). The party's primary goals are decentralization, equal regional development and Euro-Atlantic integration of Serbia. The party leader Veroljub Stevanović was former mayor of Kragujevac.

The party merged into the United Regions of Serbia on 10 June 2013. However, Veroljub Stevanović announced his plan to revive the party in late 2014, and the necessary signatures were collected by 20 February 2015.

Members of the Board

 Veroljub Stevanović, President, Together for Kragujevac
 Branko Lazović, Deputy President, Together for Čačak
 Saša Milenić, Deputy President, Together for Kragujevac
 Nebojša Vasiljević, Deputy President, Together for Kragujevac
 Goran Jovanović, Smederevska Palanka
 Miladin Lazović, Čačak
 Zoran Đokić, Kruševac
 Dragan Gačić, Gornji Milanovac
 Željko Kušić, Topola
 Aleksandar Živanović, Kragujevac
 Slavica Saveljić, Kragujevac
 Srđan Biorac, Batočina
 Nada Milićević, Kragujevac
 Milan Marković, Kragujevac
 Ivica Samailović, Kragujevac
 Zlatko Milić, Director
 Zoran Palčić, Head of Information Center

Presidency
 Veroljub Stevanović, Together for Kragujevac, Kragujevac
 Branko Lazović, Together for Čačak, Čačak
 Saša Milenić, Together for Kragujevac, Kragujevac
 Nebojša Vasiljević, Together for Kragujevac, Kragujevac
 Gradimir Jovanović - Together for Trstenik, Trstenik
 Danijel Jovanović - Together for Aleksandrovac, Aleksandrovac
 Adam Đokić - Together for Varvarin, Varvarin
 Dragan Mišović - Together for Knić and Gruža, Knić
 Dragan Gačić - Together for Gornji Milanovac, Gornji Milanovac
 Milan Ivković - Together for Topola, Topola
 Elena Milivojević - Together for Aranđelovac, Aranđelovac
 Milan Mitrović - Together for Levač, Rekovac
 Goran Jovanović - Together for Palanka, Smederevska Palanka
 Srđan Biorac - Together for Batočina, Batočina
 Slobodan Jakšić - Together for Čačak, Čačak
 Dejan Ivanović - Together for Sokobanja, Sokobanja
 Srđan Vidojević- Together for Rača, Rača

Electoral history

Parliamentary elections

 Restructured from Together for Kragujevac movement, who was in the pre-election alliance with G17 Plus and appeared on the For a European Serbia electoral list, winning 2 parliamentary mandates.

Presidential elections

References

External links

Official website

Conservative parties in Serbia
Political parties established in 2009
Political parties disestablished in 2013
Political parties established in 2015
Pro-European political parties in Serbia